Iberli is an uninhabited village approximately 5km (3.1mi) northeast of Demir Kapija in the eastern mountain valley of the Demir Kapija Municipality, North Macedonia. No more than a handful of people still have houses there. Most residents now live in Čelevec or Laki, a more recent, still-unofficial village in the municipality. Laki is just off the main highway, and recently, electricity was brought to this village. Iberli is farther along the river, which shares its name.

Demographics
As of the 2002 census, the village had a total of 0 inhabitants.

References

Notes
Demir Kapija: From Prehistory to Today , P 98-9

See also
Demir Kapija municipality

Villages in Demir Kapija Municipality